The Bangladesh Rural Development Board, or BRDB, is a government board responsible for the development in rural areas and is largest government program involved in rural development in Bangladesh and is located in Dhaka, Bangladesh.

History
In 1972 the government of Bangladesh implemented Rural Development Programme. Which was changed in 1982 to Bangladesh Rural Development Board.

References

Government agencies of Bangladesh
1982 establishments in Bangladesh
Organisations based in Dhaka
Rural development in Bangladesh